The list of Yukon by-elections includes every by-election held in the Canadian territory of Yukon. By-elections occur whenever there is a vacancy in the Legislative Assembly, although an imminent general election may allow the vacancy to remain until the dissolution of parliament.

Causes
A by-election occurs whenever there is a vacancy in the Yukon legislature. Vacancies can occur for the following reasons:

 Death of a member.
 Resignation of a member.
 Voided results
 Expulsion from the legislature.
 Ineligibility to sit.

When there is a vacancy, a by-election must be called within six months.

35th Legislative Assembly of Yukon 2021–present

34th Legislative Assembly of Yukon 2016–2021
no by-elections

33rd Legislative Assembly of Yukon 2011–2016
no by-elections

32nd Legislative Assembly of Yukon 2006–2011

31st Legislative Assembly of Yukon 2002–2006

30th Legislative Assembly of Yukon 2000–2002

29th Legislative Assembly of Yukon 1996–2000

28th Legislative Assembly of Yukon 1992–1996

27th Legislative Assembly of Yukon 1989–1992
no by-elections

26th Legislative Assembly of Yukon 1985–1989

25th Legislative Assembly of Yukon 1982–1985
no by-elections

24th Legislative Assembly of Yukon 1978–1982

See also
 List of federal by-elections in Canada

By-elections
Elections
Yukon, by-ele